is a station on the Tokyo Monorail in Ōta, Tokyo, Japan, serving Haneda Airport.

Lines

Station layout
The station is located underground beneath the Terminal 2 Building of Haneda Airport. It has a single island platform, fitted with chest-high platform edge doors. Another island platform which shares one track with the platform now in use is provided but not in use.

Platforms

Adjacent stations

History
The station was opened on 1 December 2004 in collaboration with the opening of Terminal 2, with its Japanese name written as 羽田空港第2ビル駅. From 14 March 2020, it was renamed as 羽田空港第2ターミナル駅 but retains the same English name.

Passenger statistics
In fiscal 2011, the station was used by an average of 32,001 passengers daily.

Surrounding area
 Haneda Airport Terminal 1·2 Station (Keikyu Airport Line)

See also
 List of railway stations in Japan

References

External links

 Tokyo Monorail Haneda Airport Terminal 2 Station 
 Tokyo International Airport 

Tokyo Monorail Haneda Line
Stations of Tokyo Monorail
Railway stations in Tokyo
Railway stations in Japan opened in 2004
Airport railway stations in Japan
Haneda Airport
Ōta, Tokyo